Eduard Viktorovich Dyomin (born 26 March 1974) is a Russian football manager and a former player. He is an assistant coach with FC Kaluga.

Club career
He made his debut in the Russian Premier League in 1993 for FC Asmaral Moscow and played 1 game in the UEFA Cup 1996–97 for FC Dynamo Moscow.

Personal life
His son Dmitri Dyomin is now a footballer.

References

External links
 

1974 births
Living people
Sportspeople from Kaluga
Russian footballers
FC Asmaral Moscow players
FC Dynamo Moscow players
FC Chernomorets Novorossiysk players
FC Moscow players
FC Kuban Krasnodar players
FC Volgar Astrakhan players
Russian Premier League players
Russian football managers
FC Lokomotiv Kaluga players
Association football defenders